The Gaza Mall is a shopping mall that opened in Gaza, State of Palestine, in July 2010.

The shopping venue in the Rimal neighborhood of Gaza extends over 19,000 sq. ft. There are two floors with shops offering international brands. It was built at a cost of $1.5 million.

Salah a-Din Abu Abdo, chair of the mall's board of directors, promised "attractive and competitive prices" in an effort to replace Gaza's traditional open air markets with a comfortable, air-conditioned shopping experience. His goal is to "develop a marketing and leisure culture" among Gazans. According to The Guardian, the mall is part of an entertainment "circuit" for wealthy Gazans, which includes seaside cafes, swimming at the Crazy Water Park and riding at the Faisal Equestrian Club.

The mall features a pharmacy, separate prayer rooms for men and women and stores selling shoes, toys, clothing, and office supplies.  A supermarket, children's play area, and restaurant are planned but were not operating in time for the grand opening.

According to CBS News, construction materials and concrete were brought in via the Gaza Strip smuggling tunnels.

Business model

The  stores are locally owned and the mall is a private venture, but the grand opening was televised and attended by Abu Osama al-Kurd, the Hamas government Minister of Labor.   All of the sales clerks are employed directly by the mall, and all of the shops use the same shopping bags imprinted with the mall's logo. 90% of the goods on sale are imported from Israel.

According to The Independent, "There is a widespread assumption in Gaza that Hamas... or at least businessmen close to the Islamic faction, are behind the venture." Hamas denied this and one of the mall's investors, Sarraj Abu Sleem, stated that "The government supports this economic project but the only help it has given us has been to grant us a licence." Some think that the mall is part of a wave of Hamas business ventures that include the Asdar Media Centre, a Hamas-owned business that combines a livestock farm with a film production company, the Al Bustan Restaurant and Leisure Park, and Gaza's waterpark, the child-oriented Crazy Water Park. Mohammed al-Araj, Minister of Economics in the 2006 Hamas cabinet, is believed to be the director of the water park. Some sources regard the park as one of a group of recent Hamas business ventures.

According to The Independent some observers believe that Hamas is investing in leisure and retail businesses because these will yield a faster return of cash the organization needs to fund its political and military activities. According to Agence France-Presse, "Hamas is also widely believed to be behind (the Gaza Mall)...that opened this week in Gaza City with a ceremony attended by several Hamas ministers and professors at the Hamas-linked Islamic University. The mall’s manager, Siraj Abu Selim, denied Hamas was involved in the $3 million project, but refused to give the names of any of the mall’s owners or chief investors."

See also

Gaza City Mall
Economy of Gaza

External links
 Gaza Mall website, in Arabic
 Photograph of the mall

References

Shopping malls in the State of Palestine
Buildings and structures in Gaza City